Ultra Twister is a pipeline roller coaster located at Nagashima Spa Land in Mie Prefecture, Japan. Built by TOGO, the ride opened to the public in 1989. It was moved from its original location in 1989 to a new location in 2011, which sits further north inside the same park. It is also one of the few Ultratwister models from TOGO still in operation.

Ride attendants put the fiberglass shells down to lock in their harnesses. However, on Ultra Twister models, the stations had conveyor belts to allow guests access to a car. This ride opened with seven trains. It currently runs with two, allowing the others to be spare.

Ride experience
The car goes slowly through the station, loads riders, and then flips the car straight up, into the lift hill, which is partially very slow, but soon speeds up as the car is almost at the top. As the drop, into an airtime hill, and then up into a heartline roll, a very small hill, and then a brake run, going down into two heartline rolls, and then a magnetic trim brake run allows a car to go slowly back into the station..

Colors
Originally, the ride opened with a white paint job with blue cars. In 2008, Ultra Twister was repainted yellow and teal, and red trains, along with one blue train remaining, which was used as a spare train.

Similar attractions
Until 2005, Ultra Twister had a sister coaster which operated at the defunct Six Flags AstroWorld. This version was identical in layout to the Japanese Ultra Twister, but its lift hill went up at a 45 degree angle instead of at a 90 degree angle.

Roller coasters in Japan
Roller coasters introduced in 1984